Elsa Laula Renberg (née Elsa Laula, 29 November 1877 in Tärnaby – 22 July 1931 in Brønnøy) was a Sámi activist and politician.

She was born to reindeer herders, Lars Thomasson Laula and Kristina Josefina Larsdotter and grew up near . After receiving training school in Stockholm as a midwife, she returned home to live near Dikanäs. In 1908, she married reindeer herder, Thomas Renberg. Together, they moved to Vefsn in Nordland, Norway where they lived as reindeer herders and had 6 children together. Elsa died at the age of 54 of tuberculosis in Brønnøy.

'"Do we face life or death?"
In 1904, Renberg wrote and published a 30-page pamphlet in Swedish entitled Infor lif eller död? Sanningsord i de Lappska förhållandena (Do we face life or death? Words of truth about the Lappish situation) making her the first Sámi woman to have her writings published. This work discussed several issues that were facing the Sámi, such as their education system, their right to vote, and their right to own land. The Sámi national spirit was reawakening at the point the writing was published, making it especially important. Renburg also encouraged Sámi women to work and help her in the cause. Throughout the pamphlet, she uses carefully crafted temporal rhetoric to enact resistance to Swedish colonization.

In 1904 she founded the South Sámi Fatmomakka Association, which was the first Sámi activist organisation. Its aim was to combat issues surrounding increasing state colonization and settler presence on Sámi lands, and to resolve local land conflicts, as well as improve the societal, economic, and political position of the Sámi. She was also the chair of the organizing committee of the first Sámi Assembly of 1917 in Trondheim.

References

Further reading

External links
The Pioneers: Elsa Laula And Karin Stenberg, The First Sámi Woman Writers
Elsa Laula Renberg - the mother of Sámi cooperation

1877 births
1931 deaths
People from Storuman Municipality
Swedish Sámi-language writers
Writers from Lapland (Sweden)
Swedish Sámi activists
Swedish midwives
Norwegian midwives
Swedish non-fiction writers
Swedish women non-fiction writers
Tuberculosis deaths in Norway
20th-century deaths from tuberculosis